Gabriel Eduardo Coronel Petrilli (born 13 February 1987 in Barquisimeto, Lara State) is a Venezuelan theater and TV actor, singer and model.

He began his career by participating in theater plays, then in 2007 took part in the casting of Somos tú y yo to join the cast in which he plays Gabriel "El Gago", from there decided to open routes to the United States, where he starred in the telenovela Relaciones Peligrosas as Mauricio Blanco. As star of the telenovela, he was nominated, in 2012, for the first edition of the Premios Tu Mundo and also to Premios People en Español.

Career

2007–12: Somos Tú y Yo and Relaciones Peligrosas 
Coronel studied music and acting, first at the Conservatory of Music of Lara, centroccidente in Venezuela. He began his career by participating in various modeling campaigns, and then obtained youth roles in Venezuelan telenovelas, such as Somos tú y yo on Venevisión, and its successor, Somos tú y yo: un nuevo día, also on Venevisión. Coronel also portrayed several theater roles during that time.

In 2012 Coronel made his foray into international TV, appearing with the U.S. network Telemundo, in the telenovela Relaciones Peligrosas in the role of Mauricio Blanco, a young man who is attracted to his teacher.

2013: Marido en Alquiler – Debut album 
Coronel was hired to record Marido En Alquiler, the United States remake of Fina Estampa, as Antonio Salinas, Griselda Carrasco's (Sonya Smith) son who succeeded in his effort to be the only one in his family to go to college. However he said that the character suffers the embarrassment of coming from a poor family and to see his mother working as a handyman.

In the Show he shares credits with Juan Soler and Maritza Rodríguez, also with Kimberly Dos Ramos, who played Patricia Ibarra, Antonio's girlfriend. Coronel and Dos Ramos play young protagonists.

At the end of 2012, Gabriel became the first artist to be signed under a new partnership between Telemundo and record label Warner Music Latina. His debut single, "Desnudo" was released digitally on 23 July 2013 through Warner Music Latina. The music video for the song was filmed in Miami, Fl and released on 13 August. Gabriel's first live performance of the song took place during the 2nd annual Premios Tu Mundo award show, hosted by Telemundo at the American Airlines Arena on 15 August 2013.

Filmography

Theater
 La Navidad de Lucy
 Anastasia
 La princesa Kira

Discography

Studio albums

Singles

Music videos

Awards and nominations

References

External links 

1987 births
Living people
Venezuelan male television actors
Venezuelan male models
Venezuelan male telenovela actors
People from Barquisimeto
21st-century Venezuelan male actors
21st-century Venezuelan  male singers